In music, a double whole note (American), breve, or double note lasts two times as long as a whole note (or semibreve). It is the second-longest note value still in use in modern music notation. The longest notated note is the longa, which could be double or triple the length of a breve, although its use is most commonly found in early music. The longest notated note (though now obsolete) is the maxima.

History
In medieval mensural notation, the brevis was one of the shortest note lengths in use, hence its name, which is the Latin etymon of "brief". In "perfect" rhythmic mode, the brevis was a third of a longa, or in "imperfect" mode, half a longa.

Form
In modern notation, a breve is commonly represented in either of two ways: by a hollow oval note head, like a whole note, with one or two vertical lines on either side, as on the left and right of the image, or as the rectangular shape also found in older notation, shown in the middle of the image.

Because it lasts longer than a bar in most modern time signatures in common use, the breve is rarely encountered except in English music, where the half-note is often used as the beat unit.

Breve (double-whole) rest

A related symbol is the double whole rest (double rest or breve rest), which usually denotes a silence for the same duration.) Double whole rests are drawn as filled-in rectangles occupying the whole vertical space between the second and third lines from the top of the musical staff. They are often used in long silent passages which are not divided into separate bars to indicate a rest of two bars, regardless of the duration of each bar. This and longer rests are collectively known as multiple rests. They are also used to represent whole bar rest for time signature  only.

Alla breve

Alla breve, the time signature , takes its name from the note value breve. In the mensural notation of the Renaissance, it was an alternative term for proportio dupla, which meant that the brevis was to be considered the unit of time (tactus), instead of the usual semibrevis. The old symbol , used as an alternative to the numerical proportion 2:1 in mensural notation, is carried over into modern notational practice to indicate a smaller relative value per note shape.

See also
 List of musical symbols

Notes

References

Note values